
Gmina Nowa Ruda is a rural gmina (administrative district) in Kłodzko County, Lower Silesian Voivodeship, in south-western Poland. Its seat is the town of Nowa Ruda, although the town is not part of the territory of the gmina.

Neighbouring gminas
Gmina Nowa Ruda is bordered by the towns of Bielawa, Nowa Ruda and Pieszyce, and the gminas of Dzierżoniów, Głuszyca, Kłodzko, Radków, Stoszowice and Walim. It also borders the Czech Republic.

Villages
The gmina contains the villages of Bartnica, Bieganów, Bożków, Czerwieńczyce, Dworki, Dzikowiec, Jugów, Krajanów, Ludwikowice Kłodzkie, Nowa Wieś Kłodzka, Przygórze, Sokolec, Sokolica, Świerki, Włodowice and Wolibórz.

Literary Heights Festival

The Literary Heights Festival, a Polish literary festival founded in 2015 which takes place in the vicinity of Nowa Ruda at the foot of the Owl Mountains in the Kłodzko Valley.

The event's organizers include the Mount Babel Cultural Association, the city and commune of Nowa Ruda, while the hosts are Karol Maliszewski and Olga Tokarczuk. The festival's program includes educational sessions, debates, concerts, panels, shows, meetings, poetry, literary workshops, film screenings, culinary workshops and various exhibitions.

Twin towns – sister cities

Gmina Nowa Ruda is twinned with:

 Bruay-sur-l'Escaut, France
 Giżycko, Poland
 Hronov, Czech Republic
 Somonino, Poland

References

Nowa Ruda
Kłodzko County